Mesophleps ochracella is a moth of the family Gelechiidae. It is found in Spain (including the Balearic Islands), France (Alpes-Maritimes), Malta, Greece (Lakonia and Crete), Morocco, Algeria, Libya, Italy, and probably Turkmenistan.

The wingspan is 9–16.5 mm. The forewings are variable, ranging from light yellow to yellowish grey, the wing tip around the apex and termen is darker grey with white-tipped scales.

The larvae probably feed on Cruciferae species.

References

Moths described in 1926
Mesophleps
Moths of Europe